The International A series (or A-line) replaced the S series in April 1957. The name stood for "Anniversary", as 1957 marked the fiftieth (or Golden) anniversary of truck production by International Harvester. It was largely a rebodied version of the light and medium S-series truck, incorporating a wide cab and more integrated fenders. A modified version of this truck range was also built in Australia until 1979, where it was marketed both as an International and as a Dodge.

Design
The new lower design necessitated a slight hump in the cabin floor. The stylish new front end, deleted running boards, and panoramic windshield brought the design more up to date for the later half of the fifties on this, the first all-new design to appear since Ted Ornas was put in charge of design in 1953. The hood was now hinged in the rear, rather than being a lift-off unit. The parking lights were mounted above the headlights. As with the R- and S-series trucks, there was a Travelall station wagon version developed from the new range. A step-side bed remained standard, but a new flush-sided "Bonus Load" bed was an option for the first time. There was also a gold and white two-tone Golden Jubilee Custom Pickup package available, featuring some special equipment.

B series

For 1959, the B series replaced the A series. This was the first of the series to feature V8 engines as an option, of either 304 ci or 345 ci. The usual engines were International's 'Diamond' series of inline-sixes. The B series had twin headlights, mounted above each other. The B-120 was also available with four-wheel drive. The B series was available with the same weight ratings as its predecessor, and was built until 1961 when more thorough changes took place, and the truck became known as the C series.

Australian production

In Australia the A series was built as the AA series from 1958 until 1962. Early models still have the S series grille, albeit with twin headlights. Later on (In late 1959) they received a mesh grille making them look nearly identical to the North American B series, they also received a new style dash at this time. It was the last Australian International Harvester truck to mirror the North American model, as the succeeding AB series of 1961 received many of the C series technical updates but had locally developed bodywork built by Chrysler of Australia. These received a locally built version of IHC's 240, 264, and 282 cubic inch inline-sixes called the "ABD" (for "Australian Blue Diamond"). The Australian-built trucks also have Lucas electrics, as well as some Australian-made Bosch parts.

See also
List of International Harvester vehicles
 

The AA  received its new grill and a new style dash in late 1959.

References

Further reading

External links
Marque website

A series
Vehicles introduced in 1957
1950s cars
1960s cars
Pickup trucks